Thomas Murdoch may refer to:

Thomas Murdoch (engineer) (1876–1961), Australian military engineer, director general of engineer services during WWII
Thomas Murdoch (merchant) (1758–1846), Scottish merchant in Madeira 
Thomas Murdoch (politician) (1868–1946), President of the Tasmanian Legislative Council (1937–1944)